The 2017 IAAF World Championships, the sixteenth edition of the IAAF World Championships, were held from 4 to 13 August at London Stadium in London, United Kingdom. London was officially awarded the championships on 11 November 2011.

Bidding process
When the seeking deadline passed on 1 September 2011, two candidate cities (London and Doha) had confirmed their candidatures. Barcelona, which investigated a bid, withdrew citing a lack of support from the local population and financial difficulties.

On 5 September 2011, Doha launched its marketing bid for the 2017 World Championships. The slogan of the bid was "The RIGHT PARTNER for a stronger World Championships." The bid was led by Abdullah Al Zaini and Aphrodite Moschoudi. Moschoudi successfully led Qatar's bid for the 2015 Handball World Championships. Doha also brought in Brian Roe, a member of the IAAF Technical Committee. The bid was for the championships to be held in the renovated, climate-controlled Khalifa Stadium. The Corniche promenade was to hold the road races, with the committee proposing to hold the marathon at night after the opening ceremony.

On 6 September 2011, London unveiled its bid for the 2017 championships with the slogan "Ready to break records." This was London's fourth bid in less than 15 years to host the event. The London bid team said that if their bid was successful they would introduce the "Women in World Athletics" programme.

On 11 November 2011, the winner was officially announced as London.

Venue

The championships were held in the London Stadium in Stratford, London, which hosted the athletics events and the opening and closing ceremonies of the 2012 Summer Olympics, and has a capacity of 60,000.

Six days before the events were due to begin, it was reported that more than 660,000 tickets had been sold, which was a record for the World Championships, surpassing the previous record of 417,156 tickets sold for Berlin 2009.

Media coverage
Rights to televise the championships in the United Kingdom were held by the BBC. NBCUniversal was the rights holder in the United States. In Canada, rights to televise the championships belonged to the Canadian Broadcasting Corporation.

Mascot
The mascots for the IAAF Championships and World ParaAthletics Championships were unveiled in April 2017, and chosen through a children's design contest organised by the BBC programme Blue Peter. The mascots represent "everyday" endangered species of the UK; the IAAF Championships mascot is an anthropomorphic hedgehog named Hero the Hedgehog, and for the ParaAthletics, Whizbee the Bee.

Entry standards
The qualification period for the 10,000 metres, marathon, race walks, relays, and combined events runs from 1 January 2016 to 23 July 2017. For all other events, the qualification period runs from 1 October 2016 to 23 July 2017.

Event schedule
The Women's 50 kilometres walk was held for the first time.
All dates are BST (UTC+1)

Event summary

Men

Track

* Indicates the athlete only competed in the preliminary heats and received medals.

Field

Combined

Women

Track

* Indicates the athlete only competed in the preliminary heats and received medals.

Field

Combined

Medal table

Notes
 IAAF does not include the six medals (1 gold and 5 silver) won by athletes competing as Authorised Neutral Athletes in their official medal table.

Placing table
In the IAAF placing table the total score is obtained from assigning eight points to the first place and so on to one point for the eight placed finalists. Points are shared in situations where a tie occurs. 65 IAAF members received points.

 Host nation

Participants
Below is the list of countries and other neutral groupings who participated in the championships and the requested number of athlete places for each.

Russian suspension
Russia is currently indefinitely suspended from international competition due to a doping scandal, and will therefore not be present at the Championships. Nevertheless, 19 Russian athletes have been allowed to participate in international competition included as "authorised neutral athletes" at London 2017 following a long process to show that they were not directly implicated in Russia's state doping program. These athletes include Mariya Lasitskene (high jump), Sergey Shubenkov (110 metres hurdles), Ilya Shkurenev (decathlon), Aleksandr Menkov (long jump) and Anzhelika Sidorova (pole vault) plus names from 2016 such as Darya Klishina (long jump)

Refugees
For the first time, an Athlete Refugee Team delegation was present at the competition, mirroring the efforts to include refugee athletes that had occurred at the athletics at the 2016 Summer Olympics. A total of five athletes – all of them Kenya-based refugees – were entered as part of the Athlete Refugee Team, including Somalian Ahmed Bashir Farah, Ethiopian Kadar Omar Abdullahi, and South Sudanese middle-distance runners Dominic Lokinyomo Lobalu, Rose Lokonyen and Anjelina Lohalith.

Quarantine
An outbreak of norovirus occurred at a local hotel affecting 30 athletes and officials.

Doping
An anti-doping programme was overseen at the championships for the first time by the Athletics Integrity Unit (AIU) – an independent anti-doping board within the IAAF. A total of 1513 samples were collected at the competition and were sent to Ghent for analysis by a World Anti-Doping Agency-accredited laboratory . The samples comprised 596 urine sample (212 of which were tested for erythropoietin) and 917 blood samples. The blood samples were divided into two forms – 725 were taken to feed into the long-term athlete biological passport initiative and 192 were taken specifically to identify use of human growth hormone and erythropoiesis stimulating agents. The in-competition anti-doping scheme was complemented by a more extensive  out-of-competition testing programme, which was intelligence and performance-led and amounted to over 2000 blood tests and over 3000 urine samples. An anti-doping education initiative also took place, led by the AIU and the IAAF Athletes' Commission, including an Athletes' Integrity Pledge which was taken by around 2500 athletes.

Two of Ukraine's foremost athletes, Olesya Povkh and Olha Zemlyak, were suspended for failed doping tests immediately before the championships in London.

The initial findings of the in-competition tests were that three athletes tested positive for doping, none of whom were medalists. The names of the athletes were not announced, allowing the athletes to contest the result and request a b-sample test.

Notes

See also
2017 World Para Athletics Championships
2017 World Championships in Athletics qualification standards

References

External links

Competition timetable
London 2017 Website
London 2017 document
Doha 2017 bid Website
IAAF Statistics Book – IAAF World Championships London 2017

 
World Athletics Championships
World Championships in Athletics
International athletics competitions hosted by England
International sports competitions in London
Athletics in London
World Championships in Athletics
August 2017 sports events in the United Kingdom